George Henry Horn (April 7, 1840 – November 24, 1897) was a U.S. entomologist who specialized in the study of beetles.

Born in Philadelphia, Horn attended the University of Pennsylvania, from which he graduated with a degree in medicine in 1861. From 1862 to 1866, he served in the American Civil War as surgeon to the infantry of the California Volunteers, during which time he collected insects extensively in California, Arizona, and New Mexico. He then returned to Philadelphia, where he established a medical practice, specializing in obstetrics, and was elected president of the Entomological Society of Philadelphia, the predecessor of the American Entomological Society. He would remain president of the latter society until his death.

He was elected as a member of the American Philosophical Society in 1869.

Working with the collection he had made during his service in the West, he published "more than 150 important papers, in addition to very many minor notes; in these papers about 150 genera and more than 1550 species are defined". He bequeathed his collections of insects to the American Entomological Society; they are now in the Museum of Comparative Zoology at Harvard University.

According to the entomologist Neal Evenhuis, 

Throughout his career, he worked closely with John Lawrence LeConte, most notably as coauthor of the revised and expanded 1883 edition of LeConte's then-standard Classification of the Coleoptera of North America; and after LeConte's death Horn was recognized as "easily the most eminent investigator in his chosen line of work".

References

External links

"A Biographical Notice of George Henry Horn" by Philip P. Calvert, Transactions of the American Entomological Society, vol. XXV (1898)
"The Entomological Writings of George Henry Horn" by Samuel Henshaw, Transactions of the American Entomological Society, vol. XXV (1898)

1840 births
1897 deaths
Perelman School of Medicine at the University of Pennsylvania alumni
American entomologists
Coleopterists
Union Army surgeons
Scientists from Philadelphia
People of Pennsylvania in the American Civil War